Pembroke Lakes Mall, often referred to as Pines Mall or Pembroke Lakes, is an enclosed shopping mall located in Pembroke Pines, Florida, a suburb of Miami and Fort Lauderdale. Located on the intersection of State Road 820 (Pines Boulevard) and State Road 823 (Flamingo Road), it is in between Interstate 75 and Florida's Turnpike. Owned and managed by Brookfield Properties, the mall was opened in 1992, and has  on one floor. As of 2018, Pembroke Lakes is one of South Florida's most popular malls. The anchor stores are Round One Entertainment, AMC Theatres, 2 Dillard's stores, JCPenney, and 2 Macy's stores.

History

 After a planned fall 1991 opening, the mall opened to the public on October 28, 1992 as the third final Homart property, with a  Burdines, an  Mervyn's (both opened on September 19), a  Sears (opened September 29), and a  J. C. Penney (which also opened another at Miami International Mall) as anchors. Just like Pompano Fashion Square also in Broward County, Mervyn's was the only single level anchor store while Burdines, JCPenney, and Sears had 2 levels.

The JCPenney and Burdines stores in the mall replaced their stores at Hollywood Fashion Center while Sears relocated from the Hollywood Mall. A  Dillard's later filled the fifth anchor pad between Sears and the main entrance as a fourth multi-level store. This was their second location in South Florida (the first was at The Galleria at Fort Lauderdale), and opened on August 16, 1995; the store opened almost three years after the other 4 anchors. This was likewise done at North Point Mall a year later, while stores also opened at the newly opened Seminole Towne Center and Lakeline Mall during this time (Another area store at The Mall at Wellington Green eventually opened within that mall in 2001). Only two years later, in 1997, Dillard's converted the Mervyn's store into a second location, housing the men's and home departments, thus reconfiguring their existing store to house ladies and children's clothing.

Burdines merged with Macy's in 2003 and then became simply Macy's in 2005, housing women's and kid's clothing. Shortly thereafter, in 2006, Macy's would also fill the sixth anchor pad as a second location for their men's and home departments. This  single level store was built between the food court and original Macy's. A four-story parking garage was also added next to both Macy's stores.

In 2016, GGP announced that the mall's Sears shrunk to  make room for a  square foot AMC movie theater, which opened in 2017. Sears closed on September 15, 2019. In Q3 2019, Round One Entertainment announced that a new location would open in Pembroke Lakes Mall with an original opening date of Spring 2021, in the former Sears vacant anchor store, making it the first and only Round1 in the State of Florida. Due to the ongoing pandemic, construction was severely delayed. Round One Entertainment officially opened to the public on June 11, 2022.

Current Anchors
JCPenney (since 1992)
Dillard's (since 1995)
Macy's (since 2005)
AMC Theatres (since 2017)
Round One Entertainment (since 2022)

Former Anchors
Mervyn's (1992-1997)
Burdines (1992-2005)
Sears (1992-2019)

References

Brookfield Properties
Pembroke Pines, Florida
Shopping malls established in 1992
Shopping malls in Broward County, Florida
1992 establishments in Florida